is a Japanese former swimmer. He competed in two events at the 1976 Summer Olympics.

References

External links
 

1958 births
Living people
Japanese male breaststroke swimmers
Olympic swimmers of Japan
Swimmers at the 1976 Summer Olympics
Sportspeople from Hiroshima
Universiade medalists in swimming
Universiade bronze medalists for Japan
Medalists at the 1979 Summer Universiade
20th-century Japanese people